Seaport-Airport Road (SPAP Road) is supposed to be a four-lane,  highway from Cochin seaport to the Cochin International Airport developed to improve the transport infrastructure in the city of Kochi, India. This highway passes through the Cochin Special Economic Zone and connect such major industrial units as HMT, FACT, and Kochi Refineries as also the various oil terminals at Irumpanam and also boost the flow of cargo traffic both from the port and the airport. The District Headquarters is located on this road. The IT Expressway to Infopark is starting from this road. The 13-km road constructed in the first phase acting as a by-pass to the NH 47 within the Kochi city limits.  Petroleum tankers from Irumpanam oil terminals can now move north up to Kalamassery without entering the core city areas. To ensure a smooth and durable road, natural rubber modified bitumen (NRMB) is used.

Phases

Phase I

It was inaugurated in May 2003.

Phase II

Land acquisition for this phase is in progress, construction is progressing in HMT - NAD stretch. Estimate to complete the work is Rs. 662-crore.

Phase III

Development of the entire stretch of road between NH 47 (Kochi Bypass)Bypass (kundanoor junction) and Cochin International Airport up to Kariyadu as a four-lane highway. The project has been proposed as a four-lane highway with a design speed of 100 km/hr. After completion of all stretches, this road is expected to ease the pressure on NH 47 especially where it takes more than an hour for a heavy vehicle from the airport to reach the Kochi port.

References

Roads in Kochi